Eel Weir State Park is a  state park in St. Lawrence County, New York.

Facilities
The park is open from Memorial Day through Labor Day and offers 38 campsites, picnic tables and pavilions, bass fishing, and hiking trails.

See also
 List of New York state parks

References

External links
 New York State Parks: Eel Weir State Park

State parks of New York (state)
Parks in St. Lawrence County, New York